Hypochilus bonneti is a species of lampshade weaver in the spider family Hypochilidae. It is found in the United States.

References

Hypochilidae
Articles created by Qbugbot
Spiders described in 1964